James H. Langdon Jr. (born January 17, 1938) was a  Republican member of the North Carolina General Assembly. He represented the 28th district.

References

Living people
North Carolina Republicans
21st-century American politicians
1938 births
People from Benson, North Carolina